The Director General of the Swedish Armed Forces (GD) is the director general of the Swedish Armed Forces and is the deputy head of the agency. The director general reports directly to the Supreme Commander of the Swedish Armed Forces. The position was established in 2005 to strengthen the financial management of the operations. The Director General of the Swedish Armed Forces is part of the Defence Board (Försvarsmaktsledningen, FML), a group of the Supreme Commander's top commanders. In practice, the Supreme Commander and the director general lead the development of the Swedish Armed Forces together.

Role
The ordinance (2007:1266) with instructions for the Swedish Armed Forces states that the Supreme Commander of the Swedish Armed Forces is the head of the agency and the Director General is the deputy head of the agency. The Supreme Commander and the Director General shall be supported by the Swedish Armed Forces' Management Group (Försvarsmaktens ledningsgrupp, FML). Furthermore, it states that the Supreme Commander and the Director General may also be supported by the Swedish Armed Forces' Military Strategic Council (Försvarsmaktens militärstrategiska råd). The Director General, together with head of the Swedish Armed Forces Headquarters, the Chief of Defence Staff, the Chief of Armed Forces Training & Procurement, the Chief of Joint Operations, the Director of Military Intelligence and Security, the Commander of the Swedish Armed Forces Special Forces (chefen för specialförbanden), the Chief of the Internal Audit Department (chefen för internrevisionen), the Chief of the Safety Inspectorate (chefen för säkerhetsinspektionen), the Surgeon-General of the Swedish Armed Forces and the Chief of the Safety Inspectorate (Aviation Authority) (flygsäkerhetsinspektören) are directly subordinate to the Supreme Commander.

Duties
Section 1: The Director General shall support the Supreme Commander of the Swedish Armed Forces with follow-up and analysis of the assignments or other tasks the Supreme Commander has assigned to subordinate commanders. The Director General shall lead the development of the agency's internal governance and control.

Section 2: The Director General leads the defence sector's environmental delegation.

Section 3: The Director General may enter into agreements and arrangements with agencies, municipalities, regions, organizations and individuals unless otherwise stated in ordinance FIB 2020:5.

Section 4: When the Director General replaces the Supreme Commander, all decision-making powers according to chapter 6, section 1, except 7 on FMO (Order of the Armed Forces), and 20 regarding own business trips, leave and other benefits. Of chapter 8, section 5 8 states that the Chief of Defence Staff in such cases as specified in the first paragraph decides the FMO in accordance with chapter 1, section 7. Chapter 14, section 8 states that the Deputy Head of the Swedish Armed Forces Headquarters or the Chief of Staff of the Defence Staff in such cases decide on business trips, leave and other benefits for the Director General.

Directors General

References

External links

Military appointments of Sweden
Heads of Swedish State agencies